Talis caboensis is a moth in the family Crambidae. It was described by Jan Asselbergs in 2009 and is found in southern Spain.

The wingspan is about 26.5 mm for males and 21 mm for females. The forewings are dull brown, sprinkled with some black scales. The hindwings are shiny grey brown.

Etymology
The species is named for Cabo de Gata, the type locality.

References

Ancylolomiini
Moths described in 2009
Moths of Europe